The Battle of Ansata was fought in the year 1270 AD between the forces of Yekuno Amlak, future emperor of Ethiopia, and Yetbarak of the Zagwe dynasty. The forces of Yekuno Amlak had received assistance from the Gafat whose commander was an unnamed Muslim called "The Malassay" and from Sultan Dil Gamis of the Sultanate of Shewa, giving the Amhara rebels an advantage over the Zagwe. After defeating his army, Yekuno Amlak pursued Yetbarak, the king of Zagwe, into the church of Saint Qirqos at Ansata, slaying him.

References

Ansata
Ansata